Funmedia Sp. z o.o. (previously named FunEnglish.pl) - Polish e-learning company headquartered in Wrocław. The company was founded on 10 July 2009 by two graduates of Wrocław University of Economics - Bartłomiej Postek and Krzysztof Wojewodzic. In 2011, as the first company in Poland, Funmedia received accreditation from the Ministry of National Education for its first online English coursebook for children. Since 5 August 2013, Funmedia has been a member of PIIT.

Products 

The company creates and sells language and specialized e-learning courses. In September 2013, the first mobile application to learn five foreign languages, Kursy123, was launched. In November 2013, the international version of the mobile application, Courses123, was created. Funmedia’s products are sold on 26 markets around the world (among others the U.S.A., Australia, Russia, the Czech Republic).

Social initiatives 

Funmedia carries out Polish nationwide social projects.

The National Programme for the Development of E-learning 2.0 

The initiative is co-organized with Centre for educational development. It aims at popularizing e-learning within the educational system by raising the awareness of new technologies in education among its representatives. During the program one of the three e-learning language courses is made available. Beneficiaries are school headmasters, university lecturers, teachers and administrative staff.

FunEnglish.pl in a library 
The program is carried out in cooperation with Fundacja Rozwoju Społeczeństwa Informacyjnego. It enables free access to the English course for children aged between 6-12 in public libraries. In 2013, the III edition of the program has started.

Angielski123 in a library 
The program is carried out in cooperation with Fundacja Rozwoju Społeczeństwa Informacyjnego. It enables free access to the English course for youth, adults, seniors in libraries all around Poland. The aim of this program is improving language-computing skills and increasing awareness of e-learning among Polish general public. In 2013, the II edition of the program has started.

Awards 

In 2011 and 2012, Funmedia received an award of European Language Label (ELL) - European label of innovativeness in teaching and learning foreign languages presented by The Foundation for the Development of the Educational System.

In 2013 Funmedia won the “Houston, mamy start-up” contest organized by Lewis PR agency with the support of Polish Science Parks.

External links 
 

Mass media companies established in 2009
Software companies of Poland
Companies based in Wrocław
Polish companies established in 2009
Software companies established in 2009
Polish Limited Liability Companies